The Škoda 1100 OHC (type 968) is a two-seat sports car, derived from the Škoda 1101 "Tudor" and considered the successor to the Škoda Sport. It came out in 1957 and had a plastic or aluminium body.

The water-cooled four-cylinder four-stroke engine had double overhead camshafts, a displacement of 1089 cc and a power output of 67.6 kW (92 hp). As the car only weighed  the car could reach speeds of  The body was of semi-monocoque construction with an additional frame of thin-walled tubes. Only five cars were built, three spiders with a plastic body, and two coupes with an aluminium body.

1100 OHC
Rear-engined vehicles
1960s cars
Cars introduced in 1957